Francis John Walker, QC (7 July 1942 – 12 June 2012) was an Australian politician and judge. He was a member of the New South Wales Legislative Assembly representing Georges River between 1970 and 1988 and subsequently a member of the Australian House of Representatives representing Robertson between 1990 and 1996, both for the Australian Labor Party. During his parliamentary careers, Walker held a range of ministerial responsibilities. He was the first New South Wales Minister for Aboriginal Affairs and was responsible for some of the first legislation that recognized the obligation to financially compensate indigenous Australians for the loss of their land. He has been given credit for achieving one of the first big breakthroughs in the protection of Australia's natural environment, the saving of the Terania Creek rainforest.

Early life
Walker was born in Sydney and spent early formative years with his father, a blacklisted communist, and Walker's brother in a jungle village in Papua New Guinea. Aged 12, the family moved to the New South Wales north coast regional centre of Coffs Harbour where he completed his secondary schooling. As a teenager, he was beaten by police for sitting with Aborigines in the segregated part of the local theatre. Walker developed early empathy for the budding Aboriginal rights movement.

He graduated from the University of Sydney in 1964, with an LLB, progressing to an LLM in 1969. An articled clerk from 1960 to 1965, a solicitor from 1965 to 1976 and a barrister from 1976 to 1988, he was appointed as a Queens Counsel in 1981.

Political career

New South Wales political career
A prominent figure of the left-wing, Walker was elected as the member of the New South Wales Legislative Assembly from 1970 to 1988, representing Georges River for the Australian Labor Party. He became the Attorney General with the election of Neville Wran's government in 1976 and was the youngest person to have held this post, aged 34. Walker suffered a number of reprisals as a result of his reform agenda.

He served as Minister for Justice from 1978 to 1983, Minister for Aboriginal Affairs from 1981 to 1984, Minister for Youth and Community Services from 1983 to 1986, Minister for Housing from 1983 to 1988 and Minister for the Arts from 1986 to 1988.  When the Unsworth government was defeated at the 1988 poll, he lost his seat.

Federal political career
Walker was elected as the member for Robertson in the Federal Parliament in 1990. He was Special Minister of State and Vice-President of the Executive Council from March 1993 to March 1994 and then Minister for Administrative Services until the defeat of the Keating government in 1996, when he also lost his seat.

Walker's state and federal career both ended the same way that of him losing his seat at the same time that a sitting government, which he was a minister of, had been defeated.

As a state minister, Walker's portfolios included Attorney General and Aboriginal Affairs and while he did not serve in these two portfolios as a federal minister he did however revisit these portfolio areas.

This was due to the High Court's ruling on Mabo falling under his purview as Special Minister of State.

On September 8, 1993, Peter Reith was appointed Shadow Special Minister of State and therefore Walker's Opposition counterpart.

Reith was a member of Shadow Cabinet but Walker in contrast was a minister in the Outer Ministry and not a member of Cabinet.

Walker criticised the appointment of Reith as his Opposition counterpart, specifically on Mabo.

Walker said for Reith to deal with the rights of Aboriginal people was "as appropriate as appointing
Saddam Hussein to look after the welfare of the Kurds".

Walker described Reith as "a suburban solicitor" who got grappled with complexities of Mabo.

Career after politics
Frank Walker served as a Judge of the Compensation Court of New South Wales between 1997 and 2003. On the abolition of the Compensation Court in 2003, he was appointed to the District Court of New South Wales and the Dust Diseases Tribunal of New South Wales. His caseload in the Dust Diseases Tribunal predominantly consisted of mesothelioma-related cases, and he retired in 2006.

He was also president of the Schizophrenia Fellowship from 1998 until his death in 2012. His two sons, who had schizophrenia, both killed themselves when they were 33.

Walker died of cancer, aged 69. His family accepted the offer of a state funeral that was held on 19 June 2012 at the Sydney Conservatorium of Music and was attended by several hundred people, including former Prime Minister Paul Keating, and three ex-premiers, including Nick Greiner, Aborigines, lawyers, judges (including former High Court Judge, Mary Gaudron QC), party faithful, unionists, friends and family. Michael Gallacher MLC represented the NSW Premier, and Anthony Albanese MP represented the Prime Minister.

A memorial lecture is held each year to commemorate Walker's life and achievements by the NSW Society of Labor Lawyers.

Bibliography

Forewords

References

External links

Frank Walker: A Friend in Need - A Friend Indeed

1942 births
2012 deaths
Australian barristers
Australian King's Counsel
Australian solicitors
20th-century King's Counsel
Members of the Cabinet of Australia
Members of the Australian House of Representatives for Robertson
Members of the Australian House of Representatives
Members of the New South Wales Legislative Assembly
University of Sydney alumni
Australian Labor Party members of the Parliament of Australia
20th-century Australian politicians
Judges of the District Court of NSW
20th-century Australian judges
21st-century Australian judges
Attorneys General of New South Wales